Energia (GRAU 11K25) was a 1980s super-heavy lift launch vehicle. It was designed by NPO Energia of the Soviet Union as part of the Buran program for a variety of payloads including the Buran spacecraft. Control system main developer enterprise was the Khartron NPO "Electropribor". The Energia used four strap-on boosters each powered by a four-chamber RD-170 engine burning kerosene/LOX, and a central core stage with four single-chamber RD-0120 (11D122) engines fueled by liquid hydrogen/LOX.

The launch vehicle had two functionally different operational variants: Energia-Polyus, the initial test configuration, in which the Polyus system was used as a final stage intended to put the payload into orbit, and Energia-Buran, in which the Buran orbiter was the payload and the source of the orbit insertion impulse.

The launch vehicle had the capacity to place about 100 tonnes in Low Earth orbit, up to 20 tonnes to geostationary orbit and up to 32 tonnes by translunar trajectory into lunar orbit.

The launch vehicle made just two flights before being discontinued. Since 2016, there have been attempts to revive the launch vehicle, reusing an updated version of its booster engine in the Soyuz-5 rocket.

Development history 
Work on the Energia/Buran system began in 1976 after the decision was made to cancel the unsuccessful N1 rocket. The facilities and infrastructure built for the N1 were reused for Energia (notably the huge horizontal assembly building), just as NASA reused infrastructure designed for the Saturn V in the Space Shuttle program. Energia also replaced the "Vulkan" concept, which was a design based on the Proton and using the same hypergolic propellants, but much larger and more powerful. The "Vulkan" designation was later given to a variation of the Energia which has eight boosters and multiple stages.

The Energia was designed to launch the Soviet "Buran" reusable shuttle, and for that reason was designed to carry its payload mounted on the side of the stack, rather than on the top, as is done with other launch vehicles.  Design of the Energia-Buran system assumed that the booster could be used without the Buran orbiter, as a heavy-lift cargo launch vehicle; this configuration was originally given the name "Buran-T". This configuration required the addition of an upper stage to perform the final orbital insertion. The first launch of the Energia was in the configuration of a heavy launch vehicle, with the large Polyus military satellite as a payload, however Polyus failed to correctly perform the orbital insertion.

Due to the termination of the Buran program the Energia program was concluded after only two launches, and further the payload on the first launch did not perform the final boost properly. The legacy of Energia/Buran project manifests itself most visibly in form of the RD-170 family of rocket engines, and the Zenit launcher, with the first stage roughly the same as one of the Energia first-stage boosters.

Launch history

First launch (Energia–Polyus) 
The Energia was first test-launched on 15 May 1987, with the Polyus spacecraft as the payload. An FGB ("functional cargo block") engine section originally built as a cancelled Mir module was incorporated into the upper stage used to insert the payload into orbit, similarly to Buran and the US Space Shuttle performing the final orbital insertion, since the planned "Buran-T" upper stage had not yet progressed beyond the planning stage. The intended orbit had 280 km (170 mi) altitude and 64.6° inclination.

The Soviets had originally announced that the launch was a successful sub-orbital test of the new Energia booster with a dummy payload, but some time later it was revealed that in fact the flight had been intended to bring the Polyus into orbit. The two stages of the Energia launcher functioned as designed, but due to a software error in its attitude control system, Polyus's orbital insertion motor failed to inject the payload into orbit. Instead, the Polyus reentered the atmosphere over the Pacific Ocean.

Second launch (Energia–Buran) 

The second flight, and the first one where payload successfully reached orbit, was launched on 15 November 1988. This mission launched the uncrewed Soviet Shuttle vehicle Buran. At apogee, the Buran spacecraft made a 66.7 m/s burn to reach a final orbit of 251 km × 263 km.

Discontinuation and potential revival 
Production of Energia rockets ended with the end of the Buran shuttle project in the late 1980s, and more certainly, with the fall of the Soviet Union in 1991. Since that time, there have been persistent rumors of the renewal of production, but given the political realities, that is highly unlikely. While the Energia is no longer in production, the Zenit boosters were in use until 2017. The four strap-on liquid-fuel boosters, which burned kerosene and liquid oxygen, were the basis of the Zenit rocket which used the same engines. The engine is the four combustion chamber RD-170. Its derivative, the RD-171, was used on the Zenit rocket. A half-sized derivative of the engine, the two-chamber RD-180, powers Lockheed Martin's Atlas V rocket, while the single-chamber derivative, the RD-191, has been used to launch the Korean Naro-1 (as a reduced-thrust variant named the RD-151) and the Russian Angara rocket.  The RD-181, based on the RD-191, is used on the Antares rocket.

In August 2016, Roscosmos announced conceptual plans to develop a super heavy-lift launch vehicle from existing Energia components instead of pushing the less-powerful Angara A5V project. This would allow Russia to launch missions towards establishing a permanent Moon base with simpler logistics, launching just one or two 80–160-ton super-heavy rockets instead of four 40-ton Angara A5Vs implying quick-sequence launches and multiple in-orbit rendezvous.
Tests of RD-171MV engine, an updated version of the engine used in Energia, were completed in September 2021 and may potentially be used in the successor Soyuz-5 rocket.

Proposed variants
Three major design variants were conceptualized after the original configuration, each with vastly different payloads.

Energia M
The Energia M was an early-1990s design configuration, and the smallest of the three.  The number of Zenit boosters was reduced from four to two, and instead of four RD-0120 engines in the core, it was to have had only one.  It was designed to replace the Proton rocket, but lost a 1993 competition to the Angara rocket.

A non-functional prototype ("structural test vehicle") of the Energia M still exists in a seemingly abandoned hangar at Baikonur Cosmodrome.

Energia-2 (Uragan)
Energia-2, named Uragan (Hurricane), was a rocket design proposed in the late 1980s to be fully reusable with the capability to land on a conventional airfield. Unlike the Energia-Buran, which was planned to be semi-reusable (like the U.S. Space Shuttle), the Uragan concept was to have allowed the complete recovery of all Buran/Energia elements, like the original, totally reusable Orbiter/Booster concept of the U.S. Shuttle. The Energia II core as proposed would be capable of re-entering and gliding to a landing.

Vulkan
The final never-built design concept was also the largest. With eight Zenit booster rockets and an Energia-M core as the upper stage, the "Vulkan" (which was the same name of another Soviet heavy lift rocket that was cancelled years earlier) configuration was initially projected to launch up to 200 metric tonnes into 200 km orbit with inclination 50.7°.

The development of rocket-carrier "Vulcan" and the refurbishment of the "Energia" launch pad for its launches was in progress in 1990–1993. But later on the work on this project was cancelled due to lack of funds and the collapse of the Soviet Union.

See also
 Comparison of orbital launchers families
 Comparison of orbital launch systems

References

External links

Encyclopedia Astronautica: Energia
Detailed site about Energia
Official energia.ru page 
K26 Energia page 
 A page about Energia rocket on a site about Buran spacecraft - English translation
 Energia - last Moon project. (rus) english translation

Space launch vehicles of the Soviet Union
Soviet inventions
RSC Energia